Klaus Knopper (born 1968 in Ingelheim) is a German electrical engineer and free software developer.

Knopper is the creator of Knoppix, a well-known live CD Linux distribution. He received his degree in electrical engineering from the Kaiserslautern University of Technology (in German: Technische Universität Kaiserslautern), co-founded LinuxTag in 1996 (a major European Linux expo) and has been a self-employed information technology consultant since 1998. He also teaches at the Kaiserslautern University of Applied Sciences.

Knopper is married to Adriane Knopper, who has a visual impairment. She has been assisting Knopper with a version of Knoppix for blind and visually impaired people, released in the third quarter of 2007 as a Live CD. Her name has been given to the distribution: Adriane Knoppix.

Adriane is more of a desktop or "Non-graphical-userinterface" for blind computer beginners than a "distribution". It will work on any Linux distribution that has a screenreader (Preferably SBL (Screenreader for Blind Linux Users)) and some text-based tools for internet access and normal work.

References

External links 
 Klaus Knopper personal profile at Knoppix 
 Meet The 'No Hard Disk' Man, at efytimes.com
 ADRIANE - Audio Desktop Reference Implementation and Networking Environment
 

1968 births
Living people
German computer scientists
German electrical engineers
Knoppix
People from Ingelheim am Rhein
Engineers from Rhineland-Palatinate